I Remember Me is the second studio album by American singer and actress Jennifer Hudson, released on March 22, 2011, by Arista Records. Hudson worked with a variety of producers and writers on the album, including Alicia Keys, Rich Harrison, Ne-Yo, R. Kelly, Harvey Mason Jr., Ryan Tedder, Diane Warren, and among others. 

The album debuted at number two on the US Billboard 200, selling 165,000 copies in its first week  and was certified gold by the Recording Industry Association of America (RIAA) in the United States. It received positive reviews from music critics.

Background
Hudson herself announced on Twitter in September 2009 that she would begin the process of her second studio album. Hudson mentioned to Billboard that she wanted her second album to be more personal than her debut and expressed that she wanted to become more hands on with the project. Hudson told InStyle magazine that she wanted this album to be a "feel good" album. She quoted "I wanted to take it to the next level in every way-from the image to the music to the subjects of the songs".

I Remember Me was recorded at various recording studios, namely Maximedia Recording Studio in Dallas, Instrument Zoo in Miami, Chicago Recording Company and The Chocolate Factory in Chicago, Germano Studios, Oven Studios, and Roc The Mic Studios in New York City, Mason Sound and Vanilla Sky Studios in North Hollywood, No Excuses Studios in Santa Monica, and Patriot Studios in Denver. Songwriter Diane Warren revealed to E! in January 2011 that she penned a new song for Hudson titled "Still Here". However, the song first appeared in the UK version of Natasha Bedingfield's 2007 second album, N.B..

Critical reception

I Remember Me received generally positive reviews from music critics. At Metacritic, which assigns a normalized rating out of 100 to reviews from mainstream critics, the album received an average score of 68, based on 15 reviews. Simon Price of The Independent stated "while she unquestionably has a voice, the material's nothing you'll want to remember". Genevieve Koski of The A.V. Club wrote that the album "can occasionally get a touch exhausting in its relentless emoting", but complimented its "empowered (and empowering) anthems that inevitably climax with Hudson’s vocal fireworks", but viewed that most of its songs "deserve such bravado" in "cranking her performance to 11 regardless of whether any given song warrants it". Despite writing that "Hudson is still searching for songs to do right by her voice", Allison Stewart of The Washington Post found its "pretty-good assortment of R&B songs" an improvement over her previous album and wrote that Hudson "dispatches even the most technically difficult tracks as if she were swatting away flies, her unblinking confidence reminiscent of Adele". Elysa Gardner of USA Today gave the album three-and-a-half out of four stars and stated "Even when the material [...] flirts with the banal, Hudson's unmannered strength and class shine through, as surely as the technical prowess she wields with confidence and discretion".

Allmusic editor Andy Kellman gave it four-and-a-half out of five stars and praised Hudson's performance and her collaborators' contributions, writing that they both "provide the kind of mature R&B that is not felt merely in the mind, throat, chest, or hips but the entire body". Entertainment Weeklys Mikael Wood gave I Remember Me a B+ rating and complimented its "lighter vibe". Chicago Sun-Times writer Thomas Conner noted its songs as "mid-tempo" and complimented their "deft and delicate rhythmic elements". Ken Capobianco of The Boston Globe found its songs "stronger, and Hudson sounds more poised" than on her debut album.<ref name="Capobianco">Capobianco, Ken (March 22, 2011). Review of Jennifer Hudson's "I Remember Me – The Boston Globe] . The Boston Globe. Retrieved on March 22, 2011.</ref> Rolling Stone writer Jody Rosen gave the album three out of five stars and commented that "Sonically, the record is up-to-the-minute; in spirit it's a throwback to the adult-oriented R&B of Anita Baker, Toni Braxton and Whitney Houston". Giving the album four out of five stars, New York Daily News writer Jim Farber praised her singing's focus and commented that "If the material at hand doesn't always provide that style with its ideal vehicle, Hudson's voice makes up for that with an ideal balance of feeling and force".

However, Kevin Ritchie of NOW commented that "Hudson's stratospheric voice [...] overflows with emotion, and subtlety's in short supply". Slant Magazine's Matthew Cole viewed that its material as unoriginal and stated "most of the album's hooks contain gratuitous overdubs, and when Hudson is allowed to take the spotlight, she's liable to overcook the vocal melodies in the pandering, applause-line style that every American Idol competitor learns to live by". Noting "filler songs" as "frequent", Natalie Shaw of MusicOMH gave the album three out of five stars and commented that Hudson's singing "merits something different to many of the by-numbers songs", adding that "subtlety in places would have made for a more rounded album than the blustering, galeforce power that overwhelms most of I Remember Mes arrangements". Mojo gave the album two out of five stars and stated "She's simply not being fed the right material, or getting to work with a sympathetic producer. Hudson is a soul singer not a modern R'n'B one". Los Angeles Times writer Evelyn McDonnell commented that her "big, warm, church-trained R&B diva voice [...] has never seemed comfortable among the bright shiny toys of a pop studio". Carolie Sullivan of The Guardian wrote that "the album ends with overblown ballads", but concluded that "the first three-quarters are heartlifting indeed".

The album also won the NAACP Image Award for Outstanding Album at the 43rd NAACP Image Awards. It was also nominated for Top R&B Album at the 2012 Billboard Music Awards.

Commercial performanceI Remember Me debuted at number two on the Billboard 200 chart, with first-week sales of 165,000 copies in the United States. In its second week, the album sold 56,000 copies and dropped to number seven on the Billboard 200. On April 25, 2011, the album was certified gold by the RIAA, for shipping over 500,000 copies in the US. As of September 2014, the album has sold 459,000 copies in the United States.

In Germany, the album debuted at No. 84, making it Hudson's first studio album to chart in that country.

Singles
On January 24, 2011 Hudson premiered the album's lead single "Where You At". It was written by R. Kelly and produced by Harvey Mason Jr. The song went for radio adds that same week. On February 3, 2011 due to radio adds the single made its debut on the US  Billboard Hot R&B/Hip-Hop Songs chart at number 53, having so far reached a peak of number 10. The music video premiered on BET's 106 & Park and through Vevo on February 24, 2011.

The title track was released as the album's lead single in the United Kingdom on April 3, 2011. It has peaked at number eighty-nine on the UK Singles Chart. "No One Gonna Love You" impacted on Urban adult contemporary radio in the United States on May 24, 2011. A remix bundle titled "No One Gonna Love You-The Remixes" was released as a digital download in the US and the UK on July 13, 2011. The song reached number 23 on the Hot R&B/Hip-Hop Songs. The third U.S. single was "I Got This".

Non-single track "Don't Look Down" reached number 70 on the US Hot R&B/Hip-Hop Songs chart.

Track listing

Notes 
 denotes vocals producer
 denotes co-producer
 denotes additional producer

Personnel
Credits for I Remember Me adapted from Allmusic.

 Jonathan Aarons – horn section
 Yuri Agranovsky – strings
 Matt Alanian – engineer
 Eric Archibald – stylist
 Hernst Bellevue – keyboards, programming
 Kamaljit Bhamra – Watson strings
 Tim Blacksmith – management
 Mike Boris – producer
 David Boyd – assistant
 Val Brathwaite – assistant
 Teddy Campbell – drums
 Chops Horns – horn section
 Johan Van Der Coiff – assistant
 Stephen Coleman – string arrangements
 Michael Daley – assistant
 Danny D. – management
 Clive Davis – producer
 Gleyder "Gee" Disla – engineer
 Nathan East – bass
 Rodney East – keyboards
 Lamar 'Mars' Edwards – organ
 Sharon Ehrlich – creation
 Mikkel S. Eriksen – engineer, instrumentation
 Damien "Dammo" Farmer – bass
 Marina Fleyshman – strings
 Abel Garibaldi – engineer
 Onree Gill – string arrangements
 Yaacov Gluzman – strings
 Angela N. Golightly – production coordination
 Eduard Gulkarov – strings
 Chuck Harmony – instrumentation, producer
 Rich Harrison – instrumentation, producer
 Dabling Harward – engineer, vocal engineer
 Freddie Hendrix – horn section
 Vincent Henry – guitar, horn
 Tor Erik Hermansen – instrumentation
 Andrew Hey – assistant, engineer, guitar, vocal engineer
 Hit Boy – producer
 Matt Huber – assistant
 Ken Ifill – mixing
 Tavia Ivey – vocals (background)
 Larry Jackson – producer
 Jeff Gitelman – guitar (electric)
 Cristyle Johnson – vocals (background)
 Mike "TrakGuru" Johnson – engineer
 R. Kelly – arranger, mixing, producer
 Alicia Keys – keyboards, piano, producer, programming, vocal arrangement, vocal producer

 Danielle Korn – licensing
 Dave Kutch – mastering
 Lake View Terrace Voices of Praise – choir, chorus
 Lance Tolbert – bass
 Damien Lewis – assistant
 Kathy Love – creation
 Donnie Lyle – guitar
 Anthony Mandler – photography
 Robert Marks – mixing
 Harvey Mason Jr. – keyboards, mixing, producer, vocal producer
 Kenny Mason – director
 Kay Ta Matsuno – guitar
 Ian Mereness – engineer
 Justin Merrill – assistant
 Ann Mincieli – engineer
 Steve Mostyn – guitar (bass)
 Alexsandr Nazaryan – strings
 Ne-Yo – producer
 Shannon Pezzetta – make-up
 Polow da Don – producer
 Bruce Purse – bass, trumpet
 Kevin Randolph – piano
 Salaam Remi – bass, drum programming, drums, guitar (bass), keyboards, producer
 Ramon Rivas – assistant
 Daniel Rodriguez – creation
 Salaamremi.com – producer
 Dana Salant – production coordination
 Francisco Salazar – strings
 Mats Lie Skåre – instrumentation
 Len Sluetsky – strings
 David Small – assistant
 Damien Smith – management
 Nikolov Stanislav – strings
 Stargate – producer
 Jeremy Stevenson – engineer
 Sum-Mei Luk – licensing
 Swizz Beatz – drum programming, drums, producer
 Phil Tan – mixing
 Ryan Tedder – drum programming, drums, piano, producer, synthesizer
 Sabina Torosjan – strings
 Denise Trotman – design
 Miles Walker – engineer
 Dave Watson – horn section
 Steven Wolf – drums
 Kiyah Wright – hair stylist
 Noel Zancanella – additional production, drum programming, engineer

Charts

Weekly charts

Year-end charts

Certifications

Release history

References

External links
 
 [http://www.metacritic.com/music/i-remember-me I Remember Me'' at Metacritic

Jennifer Hudson albums
2011 albums
Albums produced by Hit-Boy
Albums produced by R. Kelly
Albums produced by Alicia Keys
Albums produced by Chuck Harmony
Albums produced by Swizz Beatz
Albums produced by Ne-Yo
Albums produced by Stargate
Albums produced by Ryan Tedder
Albums produced by Salaam Remi
Arista Records albums